Zeynabad (also Romanized as Zeynābād and Zein Abad; also known as Zeynābād Sharqī and Zunābād) is a village in Arabkhaneh Rural District, Shusef District, Nehbandan County, South Khorasan Province, Iran. At the 2006 census, its population was 14, in 5 families.

References 

Populated places in Nehbandan County